The Apostolic Nunciature to Syria is an ecclesiastical office of the Catholic Church in Syria. It is a diplomatic post of the Holy See, whose representative is called the Apostolic Nuncio with the rank of an ambassador.

List of papal representatives to Syria 
 Apostolic Delegates
Aloisio Gandolfi (11 August 1815 - 13 January 1818)
Jean-Baptiste Auvergne (29 March 1833 - 7 September 1836)
Giuseppe Angelo di Fazio (5 December 1837 - 13 December 1838)
Francisco Villardel (8 March 1839 - 19 June 1852)
Serafino Milani (23 January 1874 - 21 December 1874)
Luigi Piavi (14 November 1876 - 28 August 1889)
Gaudenzio Bonfigli (19 Aug 1890 - 25 February 1896)
Pierre-Gonzalès-Charles Duval (25 February 1896 - 31 July 1904)
Frediano Giannini (20 January 1905 - 12 February 1936)
Rémy-Louis Leprêtre (18 March 1936 - 7 May 1947)
Apostolic Internuncios 
Paolo Pappalardo (19 March 1953 - 1958)
Luigi Punzolo (10 January 1962 - 17 June 1967)
became Apostolic Pro-Nuncio on 2 February 1966
Apostolic Pro-Nuncios 
Raffaele Forni (17 June 1967 - 19 September 1969)
Achille Glorieux (19 September 1969 - 3 August 1973)
Amelio Poggi (26 September 1973  - 23 December 1974)
Angelo Pedroni (15 March 1975 - 6 July 1983)
Nicola Rotunno (30 August 1983 - 8 December 1987)
Apostolic Nuncios 
Luigi Accogli (17 June 1988 - 11 February 1993)
Pier Giacomo De Nicolò (11 February 1993 - 21 January 1999)
Diego Causero (31 March 1999 - 10 January 2004)
Giovanni Battista Morandini (6 March 2004 - 21 September 2008)
Mario Zenari (30 December 2008 – present)

References

Syria
 
Holy See–Syria relations